Luke Hodge (born 15 June 1984) is a former Australian rules football player who played with the Hawthorn Football Club and the Brisbane Lions in the Australian Football League (AFL). He played for the Hawthorn Football Club from 2002 to 2017, captaining the club from 2011 to 2016. In 2018, Hodge moved to the Brisbane Lions, before retiring in 2019. Hodge started his career playing on the half-back flank but as his career progressed he has been known to push up into the midfield. He is a four-time premiership player, three-time premiership captain and a two-time Norm Smith Medallist. Hodge is widely regarded as one of the most respected players, in particular as a captain, to have ever participated in the sport.

Early life
Hodge was born in the Victorian town of Colac. Hodge supported Richmond during his childhood, with his favourite player being Matthew Richardson.

AFL career

Hawthorn (2002–2017) 

Hodge played as a half-back flanker and midfielder during his playing career. Recruited from the Geelong Falcons Under 18 team, Hodge made his debut in 2002.

Hodge was recruited from the Geelong Falcons Under-18 Football Club, and in 2001 nominated for the 2001 AFL Draft. He was the number-one draft choice of Hawthorn Football Club (which had been traded from Fremantle for Trent Croad and Luke McPharlin). Throughout his career he was often compared with Chris Judd, who was chosen with the third selection in the same draft.

Hodge made his debut in 2002 alongside mature age recruit Sam Mitchell from the Box Hill Hawks, who got traded to Fremantle along side with Luke in return for Trent Croad and Luke McPharlin

He was named in the 2005 All-Australian team and in the International Rules team for Australia.

Hodge was named sole vice-captain of the Hawthorn Football Club in October 2007.

He was named in the 2008 All-Australian team and in the International Rules team for Australia.

Hodge won the Norm Smith Medal for being the best player on the ground during the 2008 AFL Grand Final.

Hodge became the captain of the club after Sam Mitchell handed over the captaincy prior to the 2010 Peter Crimmins Medal count.

Hodge played only eight home and away games in 2012 due to a Posterior cruciate ligament injury. Returning after a brief illness that kept him out of the preliminary final, he led his side in the 2012 AFL Grand Final but didn't have a major influence on the result.

More post-season surgery followed and he missed the first game of the 2013 season, but he played the majority of the season finishing fifth in the club's Peter Crimmins Medal award. Hodge played in the 2013 AFL Grand Final against Fremantle Dockers and was listed as one of his team's best players on the day. Hawthorn's victory allowed him to claim his second Premiership and his first Premiership as a captain.

Hodge had another consistent year in 2014. He played his 250th career game in the Grand Final, with the Hawks defeating the Sydney Swans to win their 12th premiership. In the game, Hodge became only the third player (after Gary Ayres and Andrew McLeod) to win two Norm Smith Medals, and captained the side to his third premiership; his second as captain.

Hodge was suspended for two weeks in round 21, 2015 by the Match Review Panel (MRP) for an incident in which made contact with Chad Wingard in close proximity to the behind post.

Hodge's history of strong performances in finals, in particular during Hawthorn's run of three consecutive premierships in 2013, 2014 and 2015 has led to members of the media, including commentator Bruce McAvaney, to dub him "Mister September", after the month in which AFL finals traditionally take place.

Hodge announced in July 2017 that he would retire at the end of the season. In Hodge's last game for Hawthorn, he had 14 disposals in a 9-point win over the Western Bulldogs.

Brisbane Lions (2018–2019) 
He was officially traded Brisbane during the trade period.

After an impressive 2018 season participating in 19 senior matches, averaging just below 20 disposals and an 80% disposal efficiency with no reported injuries apart from a minor calf injury, it was confirmed that Hodge would play on in 2019. He has received much praise from teammates, staff of the club, and media alike for his significant impact on the team, noting his outstanding leadership both on and off the field continuing on from his time at Hawthorn.

Statistics

|-
| 2002 ||  || 15
| 15 || 9 || 5 || 157 || 76 || 233 || 57 || 24 || 0.6 || 0.3 || 10.5 || 5.1 || 15.5 || 3.8 || 1.6 || 1
|-
| 2003 ||  || 15
| 15 || 10 || 11 || 121 || 73 || 194 || 55 || 39 || 0.7 || 0.7 || 8.1 || 4.9 || 12.9 || 3.7 || 2.6 || 4
|-
| 2004 ||  || 15
| 15 || 14 || 11 || 159 || 76 || 235 || 62 || 56 || 0.9 || 0.7 || 10.6 || 5.1 || 15.7 || 4.1 || 3.7 || 4
|-
| 2005 ||  || 15
| 21 || 9 || 15 || 347 || 234 || 581 || 112 || 59 || 0.4 || 0.7 || bgcolor=CAE1FF| 16.5† || 11.1 || 27.7 || 5.3 || 2.8 || 15
|-
| 2006 ||  || 15
| 22 || 6 || 9 || 313 || 199 || 512 || 89 || 90 || 0.3 || 0.4 || 14.2 || 9.0 || 23.3 || 4.0 || 4.1 || 4
|-
| 2007 ||  || 15
| 24 || 23 || 14 || 319 || 222 || 541 || 130 || 96 || 1.0 || 0.6 || 13.3 || 9.3 || 22.5 || 5.4 || 4.0 || 16
|-
| bgcolor=F0E68C | 2008# ||  || 15
| 20 || 20 || 8 || 290 || 171 || 461 || 114 || 70 || 1.0 || 0.4 || 14.5 || 8.6 || 23.1 || 5.7 || 3.5 || 2
|-
| 2009 ||  || 15
| 19 || 10 || 5 || 234 || 190 || 424 || 71 || 68 || 0.5 || 0.3 || 12.3 || 10.0 || 22.3 || 3.7 || 3.6 || 7
|-
| 2010 ||  || 15
| 22 || 15 || 12 || 335 || 209 || 544 || 89 || 125 || 0.7 || 0.5 || 15.2 || 9.5 || 24.7 || 4.0 || 5.7 || 16
|-
| 2011 ||  || 15
| 22 || 19 || 18 || 325 || 209 || 534 || 106 || 76 || 0.9 || 0.8 || 14.8 || 9.5 || 24.3 || 4.8 || 3.5 || 17
|-
| 2012 ||  || 15
| 10 || 9 || 6 || 121 || 70 || 191 || 44 || 18 || 0.9 || 0.6 || 12.1 || 7.0 || 19.1 || 4.4 || 1.8 || 2
|-
| bgcolor=F0E68C | 2013# ||  || 15
| 23 || 11 || 11 || 349 || 152 || 501 || 115 || 81 || 0.5 || 0.5 || 15.2 || 6.6 || 21.8 || 5.0 || 3.5 || 15
|-
| bgcolor=F0E68C | 2014# ||  || 15
| 22 || 12 || 9 || 370 || 181 || 551 || 130 || 79 || 0.5 || 0.4 || 16.8 || 8.2 || 25.0 || 5.9 || 3.6 || 12
|-
| bgcolor=F0E68C | 2015# ||  || 15
| 21 || 21 || 8 || 366 || 196 || 562 || 130 || 93 || 1.0 || 0.4 || 17.4 || 9.3 || 26.8 || 6.2 || 4.4 || 13
|-
| 2016 ||  || 15
| 15 || 4 || 3 || 226 || 117 || 343 || 85 || 48 || 0.3 || 0.2 || 15.1 || 7.8 || 22.9 || 5.7 || 3.2 || 3
|-
| 2017 ||  || 15
| 19 || 1 || 2 || 276 || 164 || 440 || 119 || 47 || 0.1 || 0.1 || 14.5 || 8.6 || 23.2 || 6.3 || 2.5 || 0
|-
| 2018 ||  || 2
| 19 || 1 || 1 || 248 || 122 || 370 || 121 || 38 || 0.1 || 0.1 || 13.1 || 6.4 || 19.5 || 6.4 || 2.0 || 0
|-
| 2019 ||  || 2
| 22 || 0 || 2 || 278 || 94 || 372 || 128 || 39 || 0.0 || 0.1 || 12.6 || 4.3 || 16.9 || 5.8 || 1.8 || 0
|- class="sortbottom"
! colspan=3| Career
! 346 !! 194 !! 150 !! 4834 !! 2755 !! 7589 !! 1757 !! 1146 !! 0.6 !! 0.4 !! 14.0 !! 8.0 !! 21.9 !! 5.1 !! 3.3 !! 131
|}

Honours and achievements
Team
 4× AFL premiership player: 2008, 2013, 2014, 2015
 2× Minor premiership: 2012, 2013
 TAC Cup Premiership (Geelong Falcons): 2000

Individual
 3× AFL premiership captain: 2013, 2014, 2015
 2× Norm Smith Medal: 2008, 2014
 3× All-Australian team: 2005, 2008, 2010
 All-Australian team captain: 2010
 Hawthorn captain: 2011–2016
 2× Peter Crimmins Medal: 2005, 2010
 AFLPA Best Captain Award: 2014
 AFLPA Madden Medal: 2019
  best clubman: 2013
  most consistent player: 2017
 3× Australian international rules football team: 2005, 2014, 2015
 Jim Stynes medal: 2014
 AFL Rising Star nominee: 2002
 Ron Barassi Medal (MVP in U18 IR Series): 2001
 U18 International Rules Representative: 2001
 AFL/AIS Academy: 2001
  life member

Personal life
Hodge married long-time girlfriend since high school, Lauren Kirkman, in 2009 and has four sons, Cooper, Chase, Leo and Tanner.

He earned the nickname 'The General' (which would later be the title of his 2017 autobiography) for his leadership abilities both on and off the field.

Media career
Luke Hodge appears regularly on a Melbourne radio station segment during the football season. 
In 2011, Hodge competed in the third season of the Channel Seven television series Australia’s Greatest Athlete. He also made special guest appearances on Channel Seven's Football coverage while still playing as a special comments commentator from the 2016 season onward. From the 2020 season, he joined the network's Friday night commentary team on a permanent basis while remaining based in Brisbane.

References

External links

1984 births
Living people
Australian rules footballers from Victoria (Australia)
All-Australians (AFL)
Brisbane Lions players
Hawthorn Football Club players
Hawthorn Football Club Premiership players
Peter Crimmins Medal winners
Norm Smith Medal winners
Geelong Falcons players
Colac Football Club players
Box Hill Football Club players
People from Colac, Victoria
Australia international rules football team players
Four-time VFL/AFL Premiership players